Cambrorhytium is an enigmatic fossil genus known from the Latham Shale (California), and the Chengjiang (China) and Burgess Shale (Canadian rockies) lagerstätte. 350 specimens of Cambrorhytium are known from the Greater Phyllopod bed, where they comprise 0.7% of the community.

The fossil is conical, with iterated linear markings on its walls, parallel to its base.  Its wall is thin, and it lacks the keel that is distinctive of hyoliths.

It has been interpreted as a cnidarian polyp, with the interpretation suggesting that the animal lived in the tube and extended tentacles (of which no trace has been found) from the flat aperture.  This is supported by similarities to Palaeoconotuba.  The other possible, but probably unlikely, affinity is with the hyolith molluscs.

Its name is from the Latin rhytium, drinking horn.

C. elongatum has been described to contain an alimentary canal in a single Chinese specimen.

C. major was originally described as a member of the hyolith genus Orthotheca.

C. fragilis was originally included by Charles D. Walcott in the genus Selkirkia, – a taxonomy that was retained by later workers until finally questioned and redescribed as Cambrorhytium in the eighties.

Its similarity with the lower cambrian species Torellelloides giganteum may indicate a close relationship.

See also 
Cambrorhytium has been compared to the fossil Archotuba and Sphenothallus

References

External links 
 "Cambrorhytium major". Burgess Shale Fossil Gallery. Virtual Museum of Canada. 2011. (Burgess Shale species 31)

Burgess Shale fossils
Staurozoa
Burgess Shale animals
Prehistoric cnidarian genera
Controversial taxa
Fossil taxa described in 1908
Cambrian genus extinctions